Aparupa is a genus of beetles in the family Carabidae, containing the following species:

 Aparupa andrewesi Casale, 1980
 Aparupa beethami Andrewes, 1930
 Aparupa exophthalmica Andrewes, 1930
 Aparupa kaii Morvan, 1982
 Aparupa kirschenhoferi Morvan, 1999
 Aparupa lateromanginalis Casale, 1980
 Aparupa magar J. Schmidt, 1998
 Aparupa matsumurai Habu, 1973
 Aparupa mirabilis Casale, 1983
 Aparupa naviauxi Morvan, 1999
 Aparupa nepalensis Casale, 1980
 Aparupa rougemonti Morvan, 1999
 Aparupa silvatica Deuve, 1983
 Aparupa villosa Andrewes, 1930
 Aparupa waroki Morvan, 1982

References

Platyninae